Hugh Kingsley Ward  MC (17 September 1887 – 22 November 1972) was an Australian bacteriologist. He was Bosch Professor of Bacteriology at the University of Sydney from 1935 to 1952. He was an Australian national champion rower who competed for Australasia at the 1912 Summer Olympics.

Personal
Ward was born at Petersham, New South Wales on 17 September 1887. His father Frederick was editor of the Sydney Mail and then The Daily Telegraph. Ward was the youngest of eight children. In May 1927, he married librarian Constance Isabella Docker. She was the daughter of NSW District Court judge Ernest Brougham Docker. Ward and  his wife had a son and daughter. He died in Sydney Hospital on 22 November 1972.

Education
Ward attended Sydney Grammar School. In 1910, he graduated from the University of Sydney with Bachelor of Medicine. In 1911, he awarded a Rhodes Scholarship at New College, Oxford. In 1913, he graduated with diplomas in anthropology and public health.

Rowing
In 1909 Ward rowed in the Sydney University eight which won the men's eight event at the Australian University Championships. In 1910 he stroked the New South Wales crew which won the men's eight at the annual Australian Interstate Regatta.

After he went up to Oxford, Ward rowed for New College against the Sydney Rowing Club at the 1912 Henley Royal Regatta. The Sydney eight won the Grand Challenge Cup. Ward replaced Keith Heritage in the Sydney eight which went on to compete as an Australasian representative eight in the 1912 Summer Olympics  Men's eight race and which was knocked out in their second match race - a quarter-final. He rowed for Oxford University in 1913 and 1914.

In 1967, the University of Sydney opened the HK Ward Gymnasium.

Military
Ward was appointed lieutenant, Royal Army Medical Corps Special Reserve, on 5 August 1914.  Ward arrived in France from England a week later. He was promoted to Captain in April 1915. In 1916, he was wounded in France and that year was awarded the Military Cross for attending to wounded men in the battlefield.  In June 1917, Ward was taken as a prisoner at Nieuport, Belgium. He received two bars in addition to his Military Cross.

Medical career
In 1911, Ward was a Resident Medical Officer at Sydney Hospital.  From 1923 to 1924, he was Rockefeller Fellow  at Harvard University.  From 1926 to 1934, he was Assistant Professor of Bacteriology at Harvard University.  In 1935, he returned to Sydney and was Bosch Professor of Bacteriology at the University of Sydney until 1952.  He is said to have inspired leading medical scientists Donald Metcalf, Gustav Nossal and Jacques Miller. From 1952 to 1969, he was a medical officer with the Red Cross Blood Transfusion Service.

References

External links
 Hugh Kingsley Ward – Australian Dictionary of Biography
 Hugh Kingsley Ward  – Encyclopedia of Australian Science

1887 births
1972 deaths
Australian male rowers
Olympic rowers of Australasia
Rowers at the 1912 Summer Olympics
Australian bacteriologists
Australian Rhodes Scholars
People educated at Sydney Grammar School
University of Sydney alumni
Alumni of New College, Oxford
Australian recipients of the Military Cross
British Army personnel of World War I
Royal Army Medical Corps officers
British World War I prisoners of war
World War I prisoners of war held by Germany